The  is a six or seven-hole transverse bamboo flute used to support Japanese kagura performance.

The Kagurabue can also be known as a yamatobue.(2)

References

2 Malm, William P (1959). Japanese music and musical instruments ([1st ed.]). p54. C.E. Tuttle Co, Tokyo ; Rutland, Vt

Bamboo flutes
Japanese musical instruments
Side-blown flutes
Six tone hole wind instruments
Seven tone hole wind instruments
Kagura